Coleophora pauperculella is a moth of the family Coleophoridae that can be found in Iran and Tunisia.

References

External links

pauperculella
Moths of Africa
Moths described in 1957
Moths of the Middle East